Leckrone may refer to:

Leckrone (surname)
Leckrone, Pennsylvania